Quercus subspathulata is a Mexican species of plant in the family Fagaceae. It is native to western Mexico, found in the States of Durango, Jalisco, Nayarit, and Sinaloa. It is placed in Quercus section Quercus.

References

External links
Oaks of the World: Quercus subspathulata — info + images.
 Desert Museum.org: images of Quercus subspathulata

subspathulata
Endemic oaks of Mexico
Flora of Durango
Flora of Jalisco
Flora of Nayarit
Flora of Sinaloa
Plants described in 1924
Taxonomy articles created by Polbot
Flora of the Sierra Madre Occidental
Taxa named by William Trelease